The Boroano, Boroga, or Borogano (also spelled with v) were a group of Mapuche native to the aillarehue of Boroa in Araucanía. They were involved in several conflicts in the northern Patagonian pampas, and supported figures such as José Miguel Carrera, the Pincheira brothers, and Juan Manuel Rosas. The military power and influence of the Boroano ended with the massacre carried out by the lonco Calfucurá in 1834 during a trade meeting.
 

Mapuche groups